This is a list of the heritage sites in Victoria West as recognised by the South African Heritage Resources Agency.

|}

References 

Tourist attractions in the Northern Cape
Victoria
Heritage sites